Nora Fingscheidt is a German director and screenwriter. She has been a participant of the  film festival since 2011 for her short films, winning the prize in 2017 for Without This World (Ohne diese Welt).

She became widely known for her critically acclaimed film System Crasher, which premiered at the 69th Berlin International Film Festival in 2019 and for which she won the Alfred Bauer Prize as well as other prizes. In 2020, her film also won eight awards at the German Film Awards, including for best picture, best screenplay and best director. She directed The Unforgivable featuring Sandra Bullock based on the 2009 series Unforgiven.

Biography 
Nora Fingscheidt attended schools in Braunschweig and Argentina. From 2008 to 2017, Fingscheidt studied scenic directing at the Baden-Württemberg Film Academy.

Career 
Her short film Synkope was invited to the Max Ophüls Prize competition, was nominated for the German Short Film Prize in 2011 and received an honorable mention at the Dresden Film Festival in 2012. Fingscheidt received further invitations for the Max Ophüls Prize for the short films Zwischen den Zeilen (2011), Brüderlein (2013) and Die Lizenz (2016). She won the prize in 2017 for her documentary Without This World (Ohne diese Welt) chronicling the life of Argentine Mennonites which was also her graduation film.

In 2019, Fingscheidt was invited to the 69th Berlinale competition for her film System Crasher, where she was honored with the Alfred Bauer Prize and the Reader's Jury Prize of the Berliner Morgenpost. System Crasher was selected by Germany as their submission for Best International Feature Film at the 2020 Academy Awards, but was not shortlisted.

Personal life 
Nora Fingscheidt lives with her family in Hamburg. She has a son.

Filmography 

 2005: Objet trouvé (short film)
 2007: Auszeit (short film)
 2008: Dorfmatratze (short film)
 2008: Fluchtversuch (short film)
 2010: Synkope (short film)
 2011: Zwischen den Zeilen (short film)
 2013: Brüderlein (short film)
 2016: Die Lizenz (short film)
 2019: System Crasher (Systemsprenger)
 2021: The Unforgivable

References

External links 

Portrait of Fingscheidt at German Films Quarterly

Living people
German film directors
German women film directors
Mass media people from Braunschweig
21st-century German women writers
Year of birth missing (living people)